Discipline in BDSM is the practice in which the dominant sets rules which the submissive is expected to obey. When rules of expected behaviour are broken, punishment is often used as a means of disciplining.

Punishment
In BDSM, rules can be made so that a submissive ("sub") knows how they should behave (so that the dominant is not displeased). Rules can also be for reminding subs of their inferior status, or for training a novice sub. When such rules are broken, whether consciously or unconsciously, punishment is often used as a means of discipline. Punishment itself can be physical (ex. whipping or piercing) or psychological (ex. erotic humiliation through public nudity or golden showers) or a combination of both (ex. through predicament bondage).

The goal of discipline is to teach the sub how they should behave as well as the consequences that may arise as a result of breaking the rules of behavior. By undergoing punishment on breaking the set rules, they learn self-restraint and become better subs. The punishment is generally related to the mistake, and is generally proportionate to the severity and frequency of the mistake. For example, a punishment for speaking out of turn for the first time may be a simple restraint (such as being silenced using a gag). Similarly, the punishment for a nude male sub getting penis erection (consciously or unconsciously), despite not being allowed, can be a chastity cage.

The sub may also be given the option of choosing his/her own punishment. For example, for a minor mistake done repeatedly, the punishment can be an option to be either caned few times (physical punishment) or be paraded nude in public with a pet animal leash (mental punishment). For major indiscipline by a female sub, the choice can be between breast torture and pussy torture. For a male sub who does major indiscipline, the choice can be for instrument type (ex. whip or cane) as well as for body part (ex.back of chest or buttocks), on which to receive 50 hard strokes.

Punishments done on BDSM submissives, even harsh ones involving severe pain, should not be confused with sadomasochism. S&M involves giving pain/torture to a "sub" for the sake of enjoyment of "sub" and/or "dom". Contrarily, punishments for disciplining are in response to violations of predetermined rules by a sub, or for otherwise displeasing the dominant. However, the commonality is that there can be limits and safeword in both sadomasochism and disciplinary activities. 

Punishment is considered a necessary evil in BDSM, as without it, a sub may repeat mistakes and thus not become a proper sub. 'BDSM punishment' is also not 'forced abuse' – in the former a sub must have granted the trainer prior 
authority to punish and so cannot be termed forced. Punishment should also not be confused with BDSM training which may involve giving pain just for increasing the endurance limit of the sub. Sometimes, disciplining may avoid punishment altogether, and just a hard glance or loud voice from the dominant may be effective. 

Contrary to punishments, disciplining may also involve positive reinforcement. This includes rewarding the sub for good behaviour (ex. being allowed to sleep on bed rather than on hard floor).

See also 
 Dominance and submission
 Edgeplay
 Genital torture
 Master/slave (BDSM)
 Predicament bondage
 Salirophilia

References

BDSM terminology